Marcus Ashcroft (born 25 September 1971) is a former professional Australian rules footballer. The Marcus Ashcroft Medal, awarded to the player judged best on ground in the QClash football match played between the Brisbane Lions and Gold Coast Football Club, is named after him.

Early life
Ashcroft was born in Melbourne and raised on the Gold Coast. As a child he lived in Victoria until the age of 3 when he moved to the Gold Coast with his family. He attended Merrimac State High School throughout his teenage years.

Ashcroft began playing junior football on the Gold Coast for the Surfers Paradise Demons and later moved to the Southport Sharks to complete his junior football. In 1988 he made his senior QAFL debut for Southport as a 16-year-old. Later that year, Ashcroft would become the only Queenslander to be drafted in 1988 as the Brisbane Bears recruited the 17-year-old through their zone access.

AFL career
Ashcroft was recruited to join the Brisbane Bears in 1988 when the club was in just its second season in the VFL and made his debut in Round 9 of that year against North Melbourne at the MCG.

Ashcroft played over 150 consecutive games amongst his 318 career appearances (including 145 goals).  He was at various points a key part of the leadership group although he never captained the club.

Ashcroft became the first Queenslander to play 300 AFL games in 2003, but his milestone match would not be remembered for the right reasons, as they suffered their first defeat of that season against the Sydney Swans at the Sydney Cricket Ground. He retired at the end of that season, winning his third straight AFL premiership medallion in the process.

Coaching career

Gold Coast Suns: 2008–2017

Following the formation of the Gold Coast Football Club in 2008, Ashcroft was appointed an assistant coaching role and then promoted to football manager the following year. Ashcroft resigned from his position as football manager in October 2017 following the club's third coaching appointment in Stuart Dew and the recent sacking of former coach Rodney Eade

Statistics

|-
|- style="background-color: #EAEAEA"
! scope="row" style="text-align:center" | 1989
|style="text-align:center;"|
| 43 || 10 || 5 || 2 || 67 || 34 || 101 || 22 || 10 || 0.5 || 0.2 || 6.7 || 3.4 || 10.1 || 2.2 || 1.0
|-
! scope="row" style="text-align:center" | 1990
|style="text-align:center;"|
| 10 || 13 || 11 || 7 || 116 || 103 || 219 || 38 || 23 || 0.8 || 0.5 || 8.9 || 7.9 || 16.8 || 2.9 || 1.8
|- style="background-color: #EAEAEA"
! scope="row" style="text-align:center" | 1991
|style="text-align:center;"|
| 10 || 22 || 2 || 11 || 291 || 173 || 464 || 94 || 42 || 0.1 || 0.5 || 13.2 || 7.9 || 21.1 || 4.3 || 1.9
|-
! scope="row" style="text-align:center" | 1992
|style="text-align:center;"|
| 10 || 17 || 22 || 19 || 203 || 108 || 311 || 67 || 36 || 1.3 || 1.1 || 11.9 || 6.4 || 18.3 || 3.9 || 2.1
|- style="background-color: #EAEAEA"
! scope="row" style="text-align:center" | 1993
|style="text-align:center;"|
| 10 || 20 || 14 || 11 || 260 || 169 || 429 || 79 || 40 || 0.7 || 0.6 || 13.0 || 8.5 || 21.5 || 4.0 || 2.0
|-
! scope="row" style="text-align:center" | 1994
|style="text-align:center;"|
| 10 || 22 || 10 || 10 || 270 || 174 || 444 || 58 || 50 || 0.5 || 0.5 || 12.3 || 7.9 || 20.2 || 2.6 || 2.3
|- style="background-color: #EAEAEA"
! scope="row" style="text-align:center" | 1995
|style="text-align:center;"|
| 10 || 23 || 10 || 13 || 234 || 169 || 403 || 78 || 43 || 0.4 || 0.6 || 10.2 || 7.3 || 17.5 || 3.4 || 1.9
|-
! scope="row" style="text-align:center" | 1996
|style="text-align:center;"|
| 10 || 25 || 10 || 11 || 305 || 170 || 475 || 78 || 43 || 0.4 || 0.4 || 12.2 || 6.8 || 19.0 || 3.1 || 1.7
|- style="background-color: #EAEAEA"
! scope="row" style="text-align:center" | 1997
|style="text-align:center;"|
| 10 || 23 || 18 || 15 || 293 || 185 || 478 || 92 || 53 || 0.8 || 0.7 || 12.7 || 8.0 || 20.8 || 4.0 || 2.3
|-
! scope="row" style="text-align:center" | 1998
|style="text-align:center;"|
| 10 || 22 || 7 || 15 || 300 || 201 || 501 || 84 || 41 || 0.3 || 0.7 || 13.6 || 9.1 || 22.8 || 3.8 || 1.9
|- style="background-color: #EAEAEA"
! scope="row" style="text-align:center" | 1999
|style="text-align:center;"|
| 10 || 25 || 16 || 8 || 357 || 218 || 575 || 92 || 61 || 0.6 || 0.3 || 14.3 || 8.7 || 23.0 || 3.7 || 2.4
|-
! scope="row" style="text-align:center" | 2000
|style="text-align:center;"|
| 10 || 21 || 14 || 11 || 227 || 146 || 373 || 81 || 40 || 0.7 || 0.5 || 10.8 || 7.0 || 17.8 || 3.9 || 1.9
|- style="background-color: #EAEAEA"
! scope="row" style="text-align:center;" | 2001
|style="text-align:center;"|
| 10 || 25 || 5 || 2 || 222 || 203 || 425 || 103 || 45 || 0.2 || 0.1 || 8.9 || 8.1 || 17.0 || 4.1 || 1.8
|-
! scope="row" style="text-align:center;" | 2002
|style="text-align:center;"|
| 10 || 25 || 1 || 2 || 232 || 148 || 380 || 120 || 34 || 0.0 || 0.1 || 9.3 || 5.9 || 15.2 || 4.8 || 1.4
|- style="background-color: #EAEAEA"
! scope="row" style="text-align:center;" | 2003
|style="text-align:center;"|
| 10 || 25 || 0 || 1 || 155 || 115 || 270 || 68 || 33 || 0.0 || 0.0 || 6.2 || 4.6 || 10.8 || 2.7 || 1.3
|- class="sortbottom"
! colspan=3| Career
! 318
! 145
! 138
! 3532
! 2316
! 5848
! 1154
! 594
! 0.5
! 0.4
! 11.1
! 7.3
! 18.4
! 3.6
! 1.9
|}

References

1971 births
Living people
Sportspeople from the Gold Coast, Queensland
Brisbane Bears players
Brisbane Lions players
Brisbane Lions Premiership players
Allies State of Origin players
Southport Australian Football Club players
Australian rules footballers from Queensland
Australia international rules football team players
Three-time VFL/AFL Premiership players